Elfman may refer to:

 Clare "Blossom" Elfman (1925–2017), American writer
 Bodhi Elfman (born 1969), American actor
 Danny Elfman (born 1953), American composer
 Eric Elfman, writer
 Jenna Elfman (born 1971), American actress
 Marja Elfman (born 1972), Swedish freestyle skier
 Richard Elfman (born 1949), American actor, director

Jewish surnames
Yiddish-language surnames